In chemistry, a thiyl radical has the formula RS, sometimes written RS• to emphasize that they are free radicals.  R is typically an alkyl or aryl substituent.  Because S–H bonds are about 20% weaker than C–H bonds, thiyl radicals are relatively easily generated from thiols RSH.  Thiyl radicals are intermediates in the thiol-ene reaction, which is the basis of some polymeric coatings and adhesives.  They are generated by hydrogen-atom abstraction from thiols using initiators such as AIBN:
RN=NR  →  2 R•  +  N2
R•  +  R′SH  →    R′S•  +  RH
Thiyl radicals are also invoked as intermediates in some biochemical reactions.

References

Free radicals
Organosulfur compounds